Gorokhovka is a rural locality (a village) in Pokrovsky Selsoviet, Fyodorovsky District, Bashkortostan, Russia. The population was 81 as of 2010. There is 1 street.

Geography 
Gorokhovka is located 21 km northwest of Fyodorovka (the district's administrative centre) by road. Pokrovka is the nearest rural locality.

References 

Rural localities in Fyodorovsky District